Winter Is For Lovers is an instrumental album by Ben Harper. The only instrument on the album is a Monteleone lap steel guitar. Each track of the album is named for one of Harper's favorite places in the world.

Track listing

References

2020 albums
Ben Harper albums